Ha-105 was an Imperial Japanese Navy Ha-101-class submarine. Completed and commissioned in February 1945, she served during the final months of World War II, conducting a supply run and operating on radar picket duty. She surrendered at the end of the war in September 1945 and was scuttled in April 1946.

Design and description

The Ha-101-class submarines were designed as small, cheap transport submarines to resupply isolated island garrisons. They displaced  surfaced and  submerged. They were designed to carry  of cargo.

For surface running, the boats were powered by a single  diesel engine that drove one propeller shaft. When submerged the propeller was driven by a  electric motor. They could reach  on the surface and  underwater. The boats were armed a single mount for a  Type 96 anti-aircraft gun.

Construction and commissioning

Ha-105 was laid down on 29 June 1944 by Mitsubishi at Kobe, Japan, as Small Supply Submarine No. 4605. She was launched on 31 October 1944 and was named Ha-105 that day. She was completed and commissioned on 19 February 1945.

Service history

Upon commissioning, Ha-105 was attached to the Kure Naval District and assigned to Submarine Squadron 11 for workups. On 17 April 1945, she was reassigned to Submarine Division 16 for supply operations. On 25 May 1945, however, she was reassigned again, to Submarine Unit No. 1, and she departed Kure, Japan, that day to operate south of Honshu on radar picket duty prior to a major kamikaze attack against Allied ships off Japan. She returned to Kure in mid-June 1945.

Ha-105 got underway from Kure on 4 July 1945 for her first and only supply run, bound for Amami Ōshima in the Amami Islands between Kyushu and Okinawa. Arriving there on 10 July 1945, she unloaded her cargo and quickly departed on her return voyage. She reached Kure in mid-July 1945 and began a conversion that would allow her to carry aviation gasoline.

Hostilities between Japan and the Allies ended on 15 August 1945, and on 2 September 1945, Ha-105 surrendered to the Allies at Kure. In November 1945, the U.S. Navy ordered all Japanese submarines at Kure, including Ha-105, to move to Sasebo, Japan.

Disposal
The Japanese struck Ha-105 from the Navy list on 30 November 1945.

Notes

References
 

 
 , History of Pacific War Extra, "Perfect guide, The submarines of the Imperial Japanese Forces", Gakken (Japan), March 2005, 
 Ships of the World special issue Vol.37, History of Japanese Submarines, (Japan), August 1993
 The Maru Special, Japanese Naval Vessels No.43 Japanese Submarines III, Ushio Shobō (Japan), September 1980, Book code 68343-43
 The Maru Special, Japanese Naval Vessels No.132 Japanese Submarines I "Revised edition", Ushio Shobō (Japan), February 1988, Book code 68344-36
 Senshi Sōsho Vol.88, Naval armaments and war preparation (2), "And after the outbreak of war", Asagumo Simbun (Japan), October 1975

Ha-101-class submarines
Ships built by Mitsubishi Heavy Industries
1944 ships
World War II submarines of Japan
Maritime incidents in 1946
Scuttled vessels
Shipwrecks in the Pacific Ocean
Shipwrecks of Japan